Maund is a surname. Notable people with the surname include:

 Aaron Maund (born 1990), American soccer player
 Benjamin Maund (1790–1863), British pharmacist, botanist etc.
 Edward Arthur Maund (1851–1932), British-born Rhodesian pioneer
 Jeff Maund (born 1976), Canadian ice hockey goaltender
 John Maund (c1876–c1962), Australian rugby union player
 John Maund (bishop) (1909–1998), British-born Bishop of Lesotho
 John Maund (footballer) (1916–1994), English footballer
 John Oakley Maund (1846–1902), English banker, stockbroker etc.
 Loben Maund (1892–1957), rear admiral in the Royal Navy